Pablo Aniceto Dorado Gallinares (22 June 1908 in Montevideo – 18 November 1978) was a footballer who played for the Uruguay national team. He represented his country at the 1930 FIFA World Cup and is better known for being the first ever player to score in a World Cup final. In the final against Argentina, he scored the first goal of the match in the 12th minute, putting the hosts Uruguay in front by shooting the ball through the legs of Argentine goalkeeper Juan Botasso.

Dorado played club football for C.A. Bella Vista in Uruguay and River Plate in Argentina (1931–1935).

International goals
Uruguay's goal tally first

References

Footballers from Montevideo
1930 FIFA World Cup players
Uruguayan footballers
Association football forwards
Uruguay international footballers
FIFA World Cup-winning players
C.A. Bella Vista players
Club Atlético River Plate footballers
Argentine Primera División players
Uruguayan expatriate footballers
Expatriate footballers in Argentina
1908 births
1978 deaths